Delostoma is a genus of flowering plants belonging to the family Bignoniaceae.

Its native range is Western South America to Western Venezuela.

Species:

Delostoma dentatum 
Delostoma gracile 
Delostoma integrifolium 
Delostoma lobbii

References

Bignoniaceae
Bignoniaceae genera